Cocaine (Configurable Omnipotent Custom Applications Integrated Network Engine) is an open-source PaaS system for creating custom cloud hosting apps that are similar to Bluemix, Google App Engine, or Heroku. Several services have already been implemented this way, including a service for detecting a user's region or language, a service for accessing MongoDB storage, and a URL fetcher.

History 
Andrey Sibiryov, the original developer of Cocaine, got the idea from Heroku, another cloud platform as a service. At that time, Heroku only supported applications developed in Ruby. Using Heroku, the developer could create a Ruby app and push it to the cloud, while Heroku handled infrastructure and load balancing issues. However, Sibiryov was not satisfied with the documentation for Heroku, so he decided to create his own PaaS solution.

Initially, Cocaine was a personal project for Sibiryov. However, this changed when Yandex discovered an internal need for a scalable platform that could cope with millions of requests-per-second (RPS). Cocaine served these purposes. Now, Cocaine is used in the Yandex infrastructure.

Architecture 
The cloud is made up of one or more independent machines that have the Cocaine server (Cocained) installed. Users know nothing about the location of the services they are accessing—only the address of the load balancer and the app name are available to them. User requests are sent to the load balancer, which passes them to the cloud. In the cloud, the optimal machine is selected for each request, and then the request is executed. The infrastructure details and the app's environment settings are hidden from the developer, as well. The developer only needs to send the code to the cloud and write a special manifest for executing the code. It is not necessary to set up anything else, such as databases, key-value stores, or HTTP clients. There are services that do this, which from the programmer's point of view are native modules for the programming language the code is written in. For example, the Storage service lets users access Elliptics storage, and the Uatraits service uses data about a client's user agent and its HTTP headers to determine the characteristics of the device that sent the request.

Applying the technology 
In the cloud, apps can be written in various programming languages (C, C++, Go, JavaScript, Python, Ruby, and others) and frameworks (Node.js). Cocaine bound to a web server provides an automatically scalable deployment environment for web apps.
The cloud processes large quantities of information, thanks to the streamed data exchange interface.
Cocaine implements fault-tolerant and high-performance bus transmission of messages and events. Using the load balancer, user can create systems that are responsive to user actions.
Apps in the cloud are run independently of each other. This allows multiple versions support of the same app and "soft migration" set up for moving users to updated versions of products.
Apps can be tested in the cloud by in an isolated environment run. This way, program errors will not affect the physical system or other apps.

See also
 Amazon Web Services
 Jelastic
 Engine Yard
 Heroku
 Force.com
 Skytap
 VMware
 Rackspace Cloud
 GoGrid
 Windows Azure
 OpenShift
 Oracle Cloud

References

External links 
 .
 .
 .
 .

Cloud platforms
Yandex software